Elizabeth Mills Brown (November 28, 1916 – December 27, 2008) was a prominent American architectural historian, preservationist, and civic leader who lived in New Haven and Guilford, Connecticut.

Brown was raised in New York City and graduated from the Chapin School in 1934. She then graduated from Bennington College and earned a master's degree from Yale University.

She was the author of New Haven: A Guide to Architecture and Urban Design (Yale University Press, 1976), a meticulosly-researched volume which details over 500 structures in that 400-year-old city.  New Haven: A Guide has been reprinted many times and is widely considered to be the best source of information on New Haven's architectural history and urbanism.  The book called the landmark New Haven Coliseum building, which was new at the time, a structure of "gigantic scale" that gave spectators an "experience of sheer spatial intoxication."

References

1916 births
2008 deaths
American architectural historians
American women historians
Chapin School (Manhattan) alumni
Writers from Manhattan
Bennington College alumni
Yale University alumni
Historians from New York (state)
20th-century American women
20th-century American people
21st-century American women